The Au Sable River Canoe Marathon, presented by Consumers Energy, (also stylized as the AuSable River Canoe Marathon) is an annual  canoe race in Michigan from Grayling to Oscoda. Nicknamed and known simply as "The Marathon," it first ran in 1947, and is perhaps the oldest marathon canoe race in the United States, and is the longest, non-stop, canoe-only race in North America. The race has been billed as "The World's Toughest Spectator Race" as many of the spectators follow the racers overnight down the full  to the finish.

Since 1971, the race has been held during the last full weekend in July, during Grayling's annual Au Sable River Festival. To determine the starting position of the racers for the night of the Canoe Marathon, there is a sprint held to determine which of the teams is fastest or slowest. The sprint trials are held at Penrod's Canoe Livery. The trials are held the Wednesday, Thursday, and Friday before the race on Saturday. Each team will head upstream one quarter mile towards the Old AuSable Fly Shop. Once there you must complete a counter clockwise turn around a buoy. Then you must head back downstream to the starting point and the next team does not start until the team finishing reaches a point close to the start buoy.  On average this can take from 2 minutes and 15 seconds to 5 minutes. The overall finish times range from about 4 minutes and 30 seconds to 13 minutes. While they are on their way back to the starting buoy they must maintain the number of buoys on the left side of their canoe. Once all of the teams have finished the sprint trials they will be lined up in groups of five, from fastest to slowest, on the night of the Marathon, to make the  LeMans-style foot race that starts the race.

The Marathon starts at 9:00 P.M. in Grayling in a LeMans-style start where the competitors carry their canoes in a footrace four-blocks through town to the Au Sable River entry point. Upon reaching the Au Sable River, they begin paddling non-stop throughout the night.  In addition to paddling for 14–19 hours non-stop overnight, competitors must also make portages around six hydroelectric dams along the river race route.

To participate in the race the competitor must be at least the age of 15. In order to enter by July 1 there is a $220 fee. To enter by July 15, the fee is $320, and to enter by July 25 the fee is $420. However, the fees are all worth their prices because upon completing the race the canoers are awarded cash prizes. The reward for first place is $5,000. Second place is $3,500, and third place receives $2,500. Even if a racer finishes in 40th place, they will receive $230 which is more than their entry fee. Competitors that finish after 40th place will receive a finishers medal.

The race relies on the efforts made by many volunteers, and is organized and ran by an all-volunteer non-profit organization: AuSable River International Canoe Marathon, Inc.

The Triple Crown of Canoe Racing
The Au Sable River Canoe Marathon is one of the three marathon canoe races that make up the Triple Crown of Canoe Racing which recognizes the top performances by Marathon Canoe Racers who compete at all three of North America's most prestigious marathon canoe races:
 General Clinton Canoe Regatta, staged Memorial Day on New York's Susquehanna River - a one-day, non-stop  non-stop race from Cooperstown, home of the Baseball Hall of Fame, to Bainbridge, New York.
 Au Sable River Canoe Marathon, one of North America's toughest, richest canoe races, an overnight, non-stop  race from Grayling to Oscoda on Northern Michigan's AuSable River during the last full weekend of July.
 La Classique International de Canots de La Maurice, staged Labor Day weekend on central Quebec's majestic St. Maurice River - a three-day, three-stage  race from La Tuque to Trois-Rivieres, Quebec.

Winners
(Since 1980)

The race record for the current course is 13:54:09, set by Jorden Wakeley of Grayling, MI and Matt Meersman of South Bend, IN in 2021.

The record for most wins individually is 18 by Serge Corbin (1977 and 1979 w/ Claude Corbin; 1987–1988, 1990-1992 w/ Brett Stockton; 1994-1995 w/ Solomon Carriere; 1996–2003, 2005 w/ Jeff Kolka).

The record for most wins by a team is 10 by Andrew Triebold and Steve Lajoie (2004 and 2008-2015, 2018)

See also
Au Sable River
Grayling, Michigan
Mio, Michigan
Curtis Township, Michigan
Au Sable, Michigan
Oscoda, Michigan
Alcona Dam
Five Channels Dam
Cooke Dam
Foote Dam

References

External links

AuSable River Canoe Marathon Facebook Page
Oscoda Township
City of Grayling
Triple Crown of Canoe Racing
Triple Crown of Canoe Racing YouTube Channel

Recurring sporting events established in 1947
Canoeing and kayaking competitions in the United States
Sports in Michigan
Articles containing video clips
1947 establishments in Michigan